BC Dinamo București or Dinamo Știința București, formerly known as Dinamo-Erbașu or Dinamo Gealan, is a Romanian professional basketball club, based in Bucharest, Romania.

History
Part of one of the biggest sports organizations in Romania, BC Dinamo enjoyed plenty of success over the years. Dinamo's basketball club won the Romanian championship 22 times, also obtaining notable results in European competitions. However, in recent years, lack of support from the parent club and the emergence of very strong teams in Ploiești and some Transylvanian cities made it difficult for BC Dinamo to win any championships.

At the end of 2009/10 season, The team relegated (For the first time in its history) to Division B. then, after one season, they returned to Division A. As of 2014 the team activates in the Romanian Liga I. In the 2014–15 season, Dinamo was the runner-up in the Liga I and promoted back to the Liga Națională

In 2018, the team started a collaboration with CSU Știința București, forming a new team: Dinamo Știința București. The project is based on the idea of a team formed by young Romanian basketball players, helped by experienced foreigners. In the first season, the team finished 8th, the best ranking in the recent years for the club and managed to reach the Romanian Cup Final Four.

Trophies
Romanian Champions (22)
  1953, 1954, 1955, 1957, 1965, 1968, 1969, 1970, 1971, 1972, 1973, 1974, 1975, 1976, 1977, 1979, 1983, 1988, 1994, 1997, 1998, 2003
Romanian Cup (4)
  1967, 1968, 1969, 1980

Current roster

Notable players
- Set a club record or won an individual award as a professional player.
- Played at least one official international match for his senior national team at any time.
 Modestas Kumpys
 Justin Baker
 Willie Kemp
 Michael Deloac

1949 establishments in Romania
Basketball teams established in 1949
 
Basketball teams in Romania